Sagoni is a town in Katni district, Madhya Pradesh, India.

Cities and towns in Katni district